Heidgraben is a municipality in the district of Pinneberg, in Schleswig-Holstein, Germany.

Heidgraben may also refer to two tributaries of the Pinnau in Schleswig-Holstein:
Heidgraben (Moorrege), left tributary near Moorrege
Heidgraben (Uetersen), right tributary in Uetersen